Maurice Frédéric Guichard (3 December 1884 – 30 May 1915) was a French footballer who played as a goalkeeper. He made two appearances for the France national team from 1904 to 1905. At club level, he played for US Parisienne.

References 

1884 births
1915 deaths
Sportspeople from Eure
French footballers
Association football goalkeepers
US Parisienne players
France international footballers
French military personnel killed in World War I
Footballers from Normandy